Vallarpadam is one among the group of islands, that form part of Kochi, in the state of Kerala, India. It is situated in the Vembanad Lake, locally known as The Kochi Lake and has a population of over 10,000. Vallarpadam is one of the two islands, the other being Willingdon Island, around which the Port of Kochi is situated. The International Container Transshipment Terminal of the port is situated entirely in Vallarpadam island. Vypin island lies on its west side and Mulavukad island lies to its east.

Road transport
Vallarpadam is connected by the Goshree bridges with the city center and Vypin island. Private Buses, state government owned buses and auto rickshaws ply between the island and Kochi city.
Vallarpadam is easily accessible from both NH 17 and NH 47.

Rail transport
Since 2009, Vallarpadam is connected with Edapally Railway Station with a 4620m long rail bridge. The rail connectivity is entirely for transporting containers from the International Container Transshipment Terminal.

Economy

70% of the island consists of paddy fields; the economy principally consists of inland fishing by traditional methods and cultivation of rice.
Fishing using specially prepared net, called Valakettu, is the major income for the fisherman community called as Dheevara.

Places of interest
The Basilica of Our Lady of Ransom at Vallarpadam is a major Catholic pilgrim center in the State.
Adikkandam Bhagavathy Temple, is a famous bhagavathy temple situated in the southern part of vallarpadam Island, called Panambukad.

Location

See also

 Ernakulam District

References

External links

 VALLARPADAM: Hub of Kerala’s development

Geography of Kochi
Neighbourhoods in Kochi
Islands of Kerala
Islands of India
Populated places in India